Alexander Streltsov (born January 31, 1990) is a Russian professional ice hockey defenceman. He is currently playing with Sokol Krasnoyarsk of the Supreme Hockey League (VHL).

Streltsov made his Kontinental Hockey League debut playing with Avtomobilist Yekaterinburg during the 2009–10 season.

References

External links

1990 births
Living people
People from Nizhnevartovsk
Admiral Vladivostok players
Avtomobilist Yekaterinburg players
HC Lada Togliatti players
Russian ice hockey defencemen
Russian ice hockey forwards
Sportspeople from Khanty-Mansi Autonomous Okrug